Elections to Sheffield City Council were held on 2 May 1991. One third of the council was up for election. Since the previous election, Richard Old had defected from the Conservatives, sitting as an Independent Conservative. His failure to win re-election for the Ecclesall ward returned them to 11 seats.

Election result

|- style="background-color:#F9F9F9"
! style="background-color: " |
| Conservative Councillor Against Student Games
| align="right" | 0
| align="right" | 0
| align="right" | 1
| align="right" | -1
| align="right" | 0.0
| align="right" | 0.5
| align="right" | 711
| align="right" | N/A
|-

|- style="background-color:#F9F9F9"
! style="background-color: " |
| Wealth Redistribution
| align="right" | 0
| align="right" | 0
| align="right" | 0
| align="right" | 0
| align="right" | 0.0
| align="right" | 0.1
| align="right" | 116
| align="right" | +0.1
|-

This result had the following consequences for the total number of seats on the Council after the elections:

Ward results

Elsie Smith was a sitting councillor for Handsworth ward

Cliff Godber was a sitting councillor for Beauchief ward

|- style="background-color:#F9F9F9"
! style="background-color: " |
| Conservative Councillor Against Student Games
| Richard Old*
| align="right" | 711
| align="right" | 9.9
| align="right" | +9.9
|-

Richard Old was previously elected as a Conservative councillor

Roy Hattersley was a sitting councillor for Darnall ward

|- style="background-color:#F9F9F9"
! style="background-color: " |
| Wealth Redistribution
| Simon Rawlins
| align="right" | 116
| align="right" | 3.4
| align="right" | +3.4
|-

References

1991 English local elections
1991
1990s in Sheffield